Solomon Islands elects on the national level a legislature. The National Parliament has 50 members, elected for a four-year term in single-seat constituencies.

Political culture 
Solomon Islands has a multi-party system, with numerous parties in which no one party often has a chance of gaining power alone. Parties must work with each other to form coalition governments.

Latest elections

See also
 List of Solomon Islands by-elections
 List of political parties in Solomon Islands

References

External links
Adam Carr's Election Archive